Crisilla iunoniae is a species of minute sea snail, a marine gastropod mollusk or micromollusk in the family Rissoidae.

Description
The shell attains a length of 1.2 mm.

Distribution
This marine species occurs in the Atlantic Ocean off Madeira.

References

External links
  Check List of European Marine Mollusca (CLEMAM)

Rissoidae
Gastropods described in 1988